Gary Leonard Mills (born 20 May 1981) is an English footballer who plays as a midfielder. He was assistant manager at Wrexham until 31 March 2015. He was appointed the new manager at Rugby Town in May 2015 but left after a poor start to the season. He was player/coach at King's Lynn Town after his appointment in May 2016 before later being offered an opportunity to take over the hotseat at Corby Town as player/manager in October 2016.

Career

Rushden & Diamonds
Born in Isle of Sheppey, Mills began his career with Coventry City before joining Rushden & Diamonds in their youth system on 21 July 1997. His debut for the club, at the age of 17, came on 22 December 1998 in a Conference League Cup game away to Farnborough Town. He went on to make 16 league appearances during the 1999–2000 season, being named in the starting line-up 8 times.

The following season, Mills was part of the Rushden squad that secured promotion to the Football League after winning the Football Conference, playing in 2 league games.

Although expected to battle against relegation, the Rushden team of 2001–02 exceeded expectations by reaching the Third Division play-off final, though they lost to Cheltenham Town. During this time, Mills was still used as a fringe player, only playing 2 games.

The Diamonds continued to impress in the league, finishing first in Division Three and winning promotion the next season. Mills established himself as one of the club's first choice midfielders, playing in 30 league games. Likewise, in the next campaign, Mills played a further 30 games, though the club had far less success as they were immediately relegated back to Division Three. He did, however, score his first goal for the club that season in a 2–1 victory over Tranmere Rovers.

On 11 September 2004, Mills suffered a dislocated ankle in a league match against Oxford United, leading him to miss the rest of the 2004–05 campaign.

After the success Mills had enjoyed in the early part of his career, he was then part of the Rushden team relegated to the Conference in the 2005–06 season. He left Nene Park on 20 April 2006, his contract cancelled by mutual consent having not played since early February. Rushden's relegation from The Football League was confirmed nine days later.

Crawley Town
Mills joined fellow Conference National side Crawley Town on 10 August 2006, though he also had an unsuccessful trial with League One side Yeovil Town in July. After six months and 21 appearances, he left the club.

Return to Rushden
Mills re-joined Rushden & Diamonds on 9 January 2007 on a short-term contract. Despite numerous managerial changes at the club, Mills became a regular in the first team squad, making 7 appearances for the remainder of the season as Rushden finished in mid-table. He was not offered a contract extension by Rushden manager Garry Hill, and left the club in May 2007.

Tamworth
On 25 May 2007 Mills signed for Conference North side Tamworth, managed by Mills' namesake Gary Mills, though of no relation.

On 24 October 2007, Mills was sacked by Tamworth following an argument with manager Gary Mills. The manager accused Mills of having "no bottle, no balls, and no discipline", regarding the player's lack of effort and reaction to being dropped from the first team. The player Mills, meanwhile, retorted that Tamworth was "the worst club [I have] ever been at."

Kettering Town
Following his acrimonious departure from Tamworth, Mills went into talks with fellow Conference North club Kettering Town, signing for the club just three days later. He played 27 games, scoring twice, as the club stormed to promotion to the Conference National with 97 points. His contract was not renewed at the end of the season.

Stevenage Borough

Mills signed for Stevenage Borough on 13 May 2008, having been previously managed by manager Graham Westley whilst he was at Rushden & Diamonds. A regular fixture in the team, Mills played 37 games, including at Wembley Stadium in Stevenage's 2–0 victory in the 2009 FA Trophy Final over York City.

Mansfield Town 
On 26 May 2009, Mills rejected a contract offer from Stevenage Borough to sign for Mansfield Town on a two-year deal.

Forest Green Rovers
In October 2010, Mills signed for fellow Conference side Forest Green Rovers on a one-month loan deal. Mills played just two times for Forest Green before returning to Mansfield.

Third spell at Rushden

In January 2011, after being released from Mansfield Town, Mills was snapped up by Rushden manager Justin Edinburgh for his third spell at the club.

Bath City
Mills joined Bath City on a one-year deal in May 2011. However Mills quit the club in September 2011 when the travelling distances from his Northampton base became too much.

Nuneaton Town
After leaving Bath, Mills instantly signed for Conference North outfit, Nuneaton Town. In October 2011, Mills picked up a knee injury which ruled him out of action for three months. On 13 May 2012, Mills was a part of the Nuneaton side that was victorious in the Conference North play off final that earned promotion to the Conference National.

Lincoln City and Boston United
On Monday 21 May 2012 it was reported that Gary had signed a one-year contract with Lincoln and was named captain City.[18] On Monday 4 March 2013 it was reported that the Lincoln City captain left the club by mutual consent. In May 2013, Mills joined Boston United. He then signed on loan for King's Lynn Town in January 2014 on a deal that lasted until the end of the season.

Coaching and Management
Mills was assistant manager to Kevin Wilkin at Wrexham until March 2015 when he and Wilkin both left the club. However, Mills was then given his first taste of management after being appointed as Dave Stringer's replacement at Step 8 side Rugby Town on 13 May 2015, with former Bedford Town manager Craig Adams joining as his assistant. He left the club after a poor start to the 2015/16 season.

In May 2016, Mills returned to his former club, King's Lynn Town as player-coach. On 19 October 2016, Mills was appointed as the manager of Corby Town with fellow former Rushden & Diamonds academy product David Bell joining him as his assistant. After leaving the team on 21st in the table, and didn't manage to get a single win in the last five games, he got fired on 9 April 2017.

Honours
Rushden & Diamonds
Football Conference: 2000–01
Football League Third Division: 2002–03
                                                                      
Kettering Town
Conference North: 2007–08

Stevenage Borough
FA Trophy: 2008–09

Nuneaton
Conference North Winner: 2011–12

References

External links

1981 births
Living people
People from the Isle of Sheppey
English footballers
Association football midfielders
Coventry City F.C. players
Rushden & Diamonds F.C. players
Crawley Town F.C. players
Tamworth F.C. players
Kettering Town F.C. players
Stevenage F.C. players
Mansfield Town F.C. players
Forest Green Rovers F.C. players
Bath City F.C. players
Nuneaton Borough F.C. players
Lincoln City F.C. players
Boston United F.C. players
King's Lynn Town F.C. players
Corby Town F.C. players
English Football League players
National League (English football) players
Southern Football League players
English football managers
Rugby Town F.C. managers
Corby Town F.C. managers